Endlicher's Glossary is a glossary composed of eighteen lines of Gaulish words, mainly to do with regional placenames, translated into Latin. There are seven surviving copies of it, with the oldest dating to the 8th century.

It is named after Stephan Endlicher who first described it in 1836. It is also known as the Vienna Glossary after the city where the first manuscript was discovered and is still held, in the Austrian National Library.

See also
 Lugdunum

References

Bibliography

External links 
 Text with English translations
 Condensed notes on likely etymologies and Indo-European connections
8th-century manuscripts
Gaulish language